Indotrigonodon is an extinct genus of prehistoric bony fish that lived during the Paleocene epoch.

See also

 Prehistoric fish
 List of prehistoric bony fish

References

Paleocene fish
Extinct animals of India